Allium permixtum is an Italian species of wild onion native to Sicily and Abruzzo, though it is most likely extinct in Sicily.

References

External links
Acta Plantarum, Galleria della Flora italiana color photos

permixtum
Onions
Flora of Italy
Plants described in 1827